Milano Romolo is a railway station in Milan, Italy. It is located at Piazza Alberto Ascari, near Viale Romolo.

Services
Milano Romolo is served by line S9 of the Milan suburban railway service, operated by Trenord.

See also
Railway stations in Milan
Milan suburban railway service

References

External links

Romolo
Milan S Lines stations
Railway stations opened in 2006
2006 establishments in Italy
Railway stations in Italy opened in the 21st century